One fencer of Persian nationality competed at the 1900 Summer Olympics in Paris, thereby making him the first Olympic competitor for Persia (Iran), and the only one to compete in the Qajar dynasty. It would not be until the Pahlavi Dynasty and the 1948 Summer Olympics that the nation sent a team to compete at the Olympic Games.

Competitors

Results by event

Fencing

Malkom advanced to the quarterfinal pool, but was not able to go further.

Men

References

External links
Official Olympic Reports
International Olympic Committee results database

Nations at the 1900 Summer Olympics
1900
Olympics
Qajar Iran